Minuscule 859 (in the Gregory-Aland numbering), Νλ50 (von Soden), is a 16th-century Greek minuscule manuscript of the New Testament on parchment. The manuscript has not survived in complex context.

Description 

The codex contains the text of the Gospel of Luke 12:32-24:53 on 261 parchment leaves (size ). The text is written in one column per page, 25 lines per page.
According to F. H. A. Scrivener and C. R. Gregory it was written on paper, but according to Aland on parchment. It contains a commentary.

Text 
Kurt Aland did not place the Greek text of the codex in any Category.
It was not examined by the Claremont Profile Method.

History 

Scrivener dated the manuscript to the 15th century, Gregory dated it to the 16th century. Currently the manuscript is dated by the INTF to the 16th century.

The manuscript was added to the list of New Testament manuscripts by Scrivener (672e) and Gregory (859e). Gregory saw it in 1886.

Currently the manuscript is housed at the Vatican Library (Gr. 759), in Rome.

See also 

 List of New Testament minuscules
 Biblical manuscript
 Textual criticism
 Minuscule 858

References

Further reading

External links 
 

Greek New Testament minuscules
16th-century biblical manuscripts
Manuscripts of the Vatican Library